Mikoszewo  (formerly ) is a village in the administrative district of Gmina Stegna, within Nowy Dwór Gdański County, Pomeranian Voivodeship, in northern Poland. Mikoszewo is where the longest Polish river, Vistula, empties into the Baltic Sea. It is located within the historic region of Pomerania.

The village has a population of 710.

History
The village was part of the Kingdom of Poland, within which it was a possession of the city of Gdańsk, located in the Pomeranian Voivodeship, until the Second Partition of Poland in 1793, when it was annexed by Prussia. In 1871 it became part of Germany, from 1920 to 1939 it was part of the Free City of Danzig, and from September 1939 to February 1945, during World War II, it was part of Nazi Germany. During the war, in 1945, it was the location of a subcamp of the Stutthof concentration camp, in which the Germans imprisoned 120 Norwegians as forced labour. Following Germany's defeat in World War II, in 1945, the village was reintegrated with Poland.

References

Populated coastal places in Poland
Populated places on the Vistula
Villages in Nowy Dwór Gdański County